Manuel Enrique Hinojosa Muñoz is a Chilean diplomat who served as ambassador of Chile in countries like Bulgaria, Romania and the Dominican Republic.

References

Chilean diplomats
Pontifical Catholic University of Valparaíso alumni
Catholic University of Leuven alumni
Year of birth missing (living people)
Living people